Aliasghar Mojarad (born October 30, 1997 in Bojnord) is an Iranian volleyball player who plays as a middle blocker for the Iranian national team and Iranian club Shahrdari Urmia.

He made his debut for Iranian national team in first fixtures of 2019 FIVB Volleyball Nations League against Italy. He was named best middle blocker at several international and national tournaments including 2014 Asian Boys' U18 Volleyball Championship, 2015 FIVB Volleyball Boys' U19 World Championship, 2015 Asian Men's U23 Volleyball Championship, 2018 Asian Men's Volleyball Cup, Iranian Volleyball Super League 2017, 2018 and 2019 as well as second middle blocker at 2019 FIVB Volleyball Men's World Cup.

Honours

National team
U19 World Championship
 Bronze (1): 2015
Asian Championship
 Gold (1): 2019
Asian U18 Championship
 Gold (1): 2014

Individual
Best Middle Blocker: 2014 Asian U18 Championship
Best Middle Blocker: 2015 U19 World Championship
Best Middle Blocker: 2015 Asian U23 Championship
Best Middle Blocker: 2018 Asian Cup
Best Middle Blocker: Iranian Volleyball Super League 2017, 2018 and 2019
Best Middle Blocker: 2021 Asian Championship

See also
Milad Ebadipour

References

External links

 

1997 births
Living people
Iranian men's volleyball players
People from Bojnord
Olympic volleyball players of Iran
Volleyball players at the 2020 Summer Olympics
Middle blockers
21st-century Iranian people